Amanda G. Chetwynd  is a British mathematician and statistician specializing in combinatorics and spatial statistics.
She is Professor of Mathematics and Statistics and Provost for Student Experience, Colleges and the Library at Lancaster University, and a Principal Fellow of the Higher Education Academy.

Education and research
Chetwynd earned a Ph.D. from the Open University in 1985. Her dissertation, Edge-colourings of graphs, was jointly supervised by Anthony Hilton and Robin Wilson. She did postdoctoral research at the University of Stockholm before joining Lancaster University. Her research interests include graph theory, edge coloring, and latin squares in combinatorics, as well as geographical clustering in medical statistics.

Recognition and service
In 2003, Chetwynd won a National Teaching Fellowship recognizing her teaching excellence. She was vice president of the London Mathematical Society in 2005, at a time when university study of mathematics was shrinking, and as vice president encouraged the UK government to counter the decline by providing more funds for mathematics education.

Books
With Peter Diggle, Chetwynd is the author of the books Discrete Mathematics (Modular Mathematics series, Arnold, 1995) and Statistics and Scientific Method: An Introduction for Students and Researchers (Oxford University Press, 2011). With Bob Burn she is the author of A Cascade of Numbers: An Introduction to Number Theory (Arnold, 1995).

References

External links
Home page

Year of birth missing (living people)
Living people
British mathematicians
British statisticians
Women mathematicians
Women statisticians
Graph theorists
Academics of Lancaster University
Principal Fellows of the Higher Education Academy